WBTM is an adult contemporary formatted broadcast radio station licensed to Danville, Virginia, serving Southern Pittsylvania County in Virginia and Northern Caswell County in North Carolina.  WBTM is owned and operated by Piedmont Broadcasting Corporation.

Translator
In addition to the main station, WBTM is relayed by an FM translator to widen its broadcast area.

History
On January 1, 1940, after Lynchburg Broadcasting Corporation gained managerial control of WBTM it began exchanging programs with WLVA in Lynchburg, Virginia, for four hours daily via newly installed lines that connected the two.

References

External links
Big Hits 102.5 and 1330 WBTM Online

1930 establishments in Virginia
Mainstream adult contemporary radio stations in the United States
Radio stations established in 1930
BTM